Armstrong Grove Township is one of twelve townships in Emmet County, Iowa, United States.  As of the 2000 census, its population was 1,192.

History
Armstrong Grove is named for the early settler Armstrong who in the year 1856 claimed  of land in a grove on the Des Moines River.

Geography
According to the United States Census Bureau, Armstrong Grove Township covers an area of 36.45 square miles (94.41 square kilometers).

Cities, towns, villages
 Armstrong

Unincorporated towns
 Halfa at 
(This list is based on USGS data and may include former settlements.)

Adjacent townships
 Iowa Lake Township (north)
 Eagle Township, Kossuth County (northeast)
 Swea Township, Kossuth County (east)
 Seneca Township, Kossuth County (southeast)
 Denmark Township (south)
 Jack Creek Township (southwest)
 Swan Lake Township (west)
 Lincoln Township (northwest)

Cemeteries
The township contains these three cemeteries: Armstrong Grove, Mount Calvary and Saint Marys Catholic.

Major highways
  Iowa Highway 9
  Iowa Highway 15

School districts
 Armstrong-Ringsted Community School District

Political districts
 Iowa's 4th congressional district
 State House District 7
 State Senate District 4

References

Bibliography
 United States Census Bureau 2008 TIGER/Line Shapefiles
 United States Board on Geographic Names (GNIS)
 United States National Atlas

External links
 US-Counties.com
 City-Data.com

Townships in Emmet County, Iowa
Townships in Iowa